Miss Ajumma is a 2011 South Korean television series starring Oh Hyun-kyung, Kwon Oh-joong, Jung Shi-ah, Kim Jung-min and Jung Sung-woon. The morning soap opera aired on SBS on Mondays to Fridays at 8:40 a.m. from May 30, 2011 to October 21, 2011 for 103 episodes.

Plot
Kang Geum-hwa (Oh Hyun-kyung) quit her job after getting married and having a daughter. Uncomplaining and trusting, she tries her best to make a happy home for her family. But when she learns that her husband Go Kyung-se (Kwon Oh-joong) is having an affair, she divorces him. Initially miserable, Geum-hwa undergoes a makeover. Now confident and attractive, she is ready to start a new life with her daughter.

Kyung-se, the president of advertising company Sweet Rain, remarries. Eventually, he comes to the realization of how important Geum-hwa is to him, and wants her back. But his new wife Wang Se-mi (Jung Shi-ah) isn't going to let him go without a fight.

Cast
Main cast
Oh Hyun-kyung as Kang Geum-hwa
Kwon Oh-joong as Go Kyung-se
Jung Shi-ah as Wang Se-mi
Kim Jung-min as Yoon Jung-woo
Jung Sung-woon as Wang Bong-soo

Supporting cast
Kim Hyung-ja as Kwon Hee-ja
Yeom Dong-heon as Kang Ho-shik
Yu Ji-in as Lee Mi-ok
Lee Da-jin as Kang Eun-hwa
Oh Na-ra as Kim Hyun-sook
Kim Jong-seok as Hwang Jong-goo
 In Gyo-jin as Lee Byung-chul
Jang Mi-ja as Byung-chul's mother
Min Joon-hyun as Kyung-se's friend
Park Ran as Yeo Woo-kyung

Notes

External links
 Miss Ajumma official SBS website

International broadcast
 It aired in Vietnam on HTV2 from September 26, 2015, under the title Tạm biệt hôn nhân.

Seoul Broadcasting System television dramas
2011 South Korean television series debuts
2011 South Korean television series endings
Korean-language television shows
South Korean romance television series
Television series by Hwa&Dam Pictures